Kenneth Charles Blume III, known professionally as Kenny Beats, is an American record producer, audio engineer, and songwriter.

Early life
Kenneth Blume III was born and raised in Greenwich, Connecticut.  He has been studying music since the age of 9 when he started playing the guitar, playing drums since the age of 11, and producing music since his sophomore year of high school.  His first guitar was a Fender Stratocaster and his first amplifier was a Fender Hot-Rod Deluxe.  During his junior year at Greenwich High School, he was able to enter a national electronic-music competition hosted by the National Association for Music Education (NAFME) and the National School Boards Association (NSBA).  Blume III won second place in the competition, which motivated him to start taking music production seriously.

After he graduated high school, he moved to New York, where he started interning for Cinematic Music Group in the summer of 2010.  His internship at CMG led to his collaboration with artist Smoke DZA on 4 of his albums.  It was also during the year 2010 when his music attracted the attention of Levi Maestro, leading to their collaboration on an ad campaign for Brisk.  After spending some time in New York, he moved to Boston and studied Jazz Guitar and Music Business at Berklee College of Music.

Musical style 
Kenny's production style varies. His digital audio workstation (DAW) of choice is Ableton Live. He plays piano, bass guitar, electric guitar & drums and often implements live instrumentation into his instrumentals, whether it performed by him or from a fellow instrumentalist.

A lot of his productions credits often fall into the Trap music sub-genre of hip-hop, commonly using 16th/8th note hi-hats with slight variation (such as rolls), hard-hitting kick drums, snares & booming 808 bass shots. He also explores more versatile instrumentation, tempos, production styles etc. such as with the likes of the more laid back and instrumental approach of songs such as singer Dominic Fike's "Phone Numbers" which contains a live guitar sample (performed by SNL lead guitarist Jared Scharff) and a more acoustic feel, backed by a Virtual Studio Technology (VST) version of a real electric bass within Ableton Live that plays the bass line, provided via the Kontakt (sampler) VST. Another style of his production leans to a more experimental sound, found within his collaborative project with rapper Denzel Curry, Unlocked which contains many spoken word samples scattered throughout the tracks and a more disjointed feel, provided by various creative implementations of obscure musical samples found throughout the project. His songs often begin with the producer tag "Whoa, Kenny!", which was originally said by the Atlanta rapper KEY!, who is a frequent collaborator of Kenny's.

Loudpvck 

In 2009, while attending Berklee College of Music, Kenny met Ryan Marks, a DJ. These two became friends, and in 2012, they decided to form the EDM duo Loudpvck. Marks ultimately left the group in 2017 while Kenny transitioned from being a EDM producer to a hip-hop producer.

Social media presence
Kenny calls his studio The Cave, and beginning in March 2019, launched a YouTube series of the same name, in which he invites artists to rap 16-32 bars over a custom beat he creates during the video.  Usually, the artists are people that he already has experience with, or, is already friends with. The Cave is known for showcasing not only these artists' lyricism, but their personalities. In addition to being his studio and the name of his YouTube series, The Cave is also the home to D.O.T.S. (Don't Over Think Shit), a creative group and brand that assists artists with their artistic vision.

Discography
Studio albums
 Louie (2022)

Collaborative albums
 777 (with KEY!) (2018)
 2 Minute Drills (with ALLBLACK) (2018)
 Anger Management (with Rico Nasty) (2019)
 Netflix & Deal (with 03 Greedo) (2019)
 Unlocked (with Denzel Curry) (2020)

Production discography

References

External links 
 Official Instagram (verified) 

American hip hop record producers
Living people
Twitch (service) streamers
Berklee College of Music alumni
1991 births
Ableton Live users